Salvadoran rap or Guanaco hip hop is a type of rap music that comes from El Salvador. It is a style of music that emerged from groups such as Pescozada and Mecate in the late 1990s. Salvadoran hip hop arose about 30 years ago following a large migration of Salvadorans to  LA. Their arrival occurred during a surge in popularity of hip hop in the United States, which allowed them to participate. Salvadoran hip hop is still a smaller kind of music but it is an important part to communities and the lives of many Salvadorans.

See also
List of Salvadoran hip hop musicians
Reyes del Bajo Mundo

References

Hip hop
Latin hip hop
Hip hop by country
North American hip hop